Talwrn is a small village between the county town of Llangefni and Pentraeth on the Isle of Anglesey, north Wales. Talwrn is most notable for the Grade II-listed 16th-century manor house of Plas Llanddyfnan, which lies just to the north of the hamlet. Plas Llanddyfnan is a Queen Anne manor house from the early 18th century. Plas Llanddyfnan was owned by seven generations of the Griffiths family.

To the west and south of Talwrn are a number of unimproved fields which have been designated as a site of special scientific interest because of the botanical assemblage supported on the neutral grassland and mire.

References

Sites of Special Scientific Interest in West Gwynedd
Llanddyfnan